Carrell is a surname. Notable people with the surname include:

Al Carrell, columnist, author, radio personality, and home construction/improvement expert
Alexis Carrel aka Carrell (1873–1944), French surgeon, biologist and eugenicist
Duane Carrell, American football player 
George Aloysius Carrell (1803–1868), rector at Xavier University in Cincinnati, Ohio, and first Roman Catholic Bishop of Covington, Kentucky
James P. Carrell (1787–1854), minister, singing teacher, composer and songbook compiler
John Carrell (figure skater),  American ice dancer
Jordan Carrell (born 1994), American football player
Mike Carrell (1944–2013), American politician and educator
Monroe J. Carell Jr. (1932–2008), American businessman and philanthropist
Peter Carrell (born 1959), New Zealand Anglican bishop
Rudi Carrell (1934–2006), Dutch entertainer
Suzanne Carrell, founder of the Congrès de la Culture Francaise en Floride

See also

Carel
Carrel
Carell
Carroll (given name)
McCarrell

English-language surnames
French-language surnames